Vaikunth Givind Desai (born 25 May 1942) is an Indian politician and teacher from Goa. He is a former member of the Goa Legislative Assembly representing the Quepem Assembly constituency from 1977 to 1989. He also served as a Deputy speaker from 1980 to 1985 in the Goa Legislative Assembly.

Early life and education
Vaikunt Givind Desai was born at Sheldem, Quepem. He completed his fifth grade of Lyceum. Desai then completed his schooling from Infant Jesus High School, Cuncolim. He graduated from S.P.C. College, Margao. He further completed his Bachelor of Science from Nirmala Institute, Panaji and later received a Master of Education degree from Tilak College Of Education, Pune.

References

1942 births
Living people
Goa MLAs 1977–1980
Goa MLAs 1980–1984
Goa MLAs 1984–1989
People from South Goa district
Goan people
Educators from Goa
Former members of Indian National Congress from Goa